The 1969 Miami Redskins football team was an American football team that represented Miami University in the Mid-American Conference (MAC) during the 1969 NCAA University Division football season. In their first season under head coach Bill Mallory, Miami compiled a 7–3 record (2–3 against MAC opponents), finished in a tie for third second place in the MAC, and outscored all opponents by a combined total of 231 to 139.

The team's statistical leaders included quarterback Jim Bengala with 1,276 passing yards, Cleveland Dickerson with 622 rushing yards, and end Mike Palija with 567 receiving yards.

Dick Adams won the Miami most valuable player award. Kent Thompson and Merv Nugent were the team captains.

Schedule

References

Miami
Miami RedHawks football seasons
Miami Redskins football